The Moers Festival is an annual international music festival in Moers, Germany. The festival has changed from concentrating on free jazz to including world and pop music, though it still invites many avant-garde jazz musicians. Performers at Moers include Lester Bowie, Fred Frith, Jan Garbarek, Herbie Hancock, Abdullah Ibrahim, David Murray, Sun Ra, Archie Shepp, and Cecil Taylor. The festival is officially named "mœrs festival" with lowercase letters.

History 

The festival was founded in 1971 by Burkhard Hennen. Three years later, he formed Moers Music to sell performances recorded at the festival.

In the early years the festival took place in the paved yard of the castle. In 1975 it was moved to a nearby park because of increased attendance. After a few years outdoors, it moved to a large venue. African Dance Night was added in 1985. Musicians such as Mory Kanté, Salif Keita, Cheb Mami, and Youssou N'Dour played there. After the artistic director changed in 2005, the event was discontinued. In 2005, after 34 years as artistic director, Hennen handed the job to Reiner Michalke. After Michalke, the position went to Tim Isfort, a musician who grew up in Moers.

Due to financial problems in the 2000s, the festival was reduced to three days.

Selected discography
1974: Anthony Braxton – Solo: Live at Moers Festival
1974: Anthony Braxton – Quartet: Live at Moers Festival
1974: Frank Wright Quartet - Unity
1976: Anthony Braxton and George E. Lewis – Elements of Surprise
1976: John Surman – Live at Moers Festival
1977: World Saxophone Quartet – Point of No Return
1978: Phillip Wilson Quartet – Live at Moers Festival
1978: Wadada Leo Smith – The Mass on the World
1979: David Murray/Sunny Murray Trio – Live at Moers
1987: Reichlich Weiblich – Live at Moers Festival 87
1993: Jamaaladeen Tacuma with Basso Nouveau – The Night of Chamber Music
1993: Richard Teitelbaum – Cyberband
2005: James Choice Orchestra – Live at Moers

2018: Sebastian Gramss' States of Play - Live at Moers Festival (vinyl)

References

External links 

 

Music festivals established in 1972
Festival
Jazz festivals in Germany
Culture of North Rhine-Westphalia
1972 establishments in Germany